Alan E. Mitchell is a Canadian former politician. He represented the electoral district of Dartmouth-Cole Harbour in the Nova Scotia House of Assembly from 1993 to 1998. He was a member of the Nova Scotia Liberal Party.

Mitchell was elected in the 1993 provincial election, defeating Progressive Conservative Michael MacDonald by almost 1,200 votes. He served as a backbench member of John Savage's government until April 2, 1997, when Savage appointed him to the Executive Council of Nova Scotia as Minister of Justice. Mitchell continued in the portfolio when Russell MacLellan took over as premier in July 1997. Mitchell was defeated by New Democrat Darrell Dexter when he ran for re-election in 1998.

References

Living people
Nova Scotia Liberal Party MLAs
Members of the Executive Council of Nova Scotia
Place of birth missing (living people)
Canadian lawyers
1945 births